Rassoul Ndiaye (born 11 December 2001) is a professional footballer who plays as a midfielder for Ligue 2 club Sochaux. Born in France, he is a youth international for Senegal.

Professional career
Ndiaye is a youth product of Sochaux, and signed his first professional contract with Sochaux on 20 March 2019. On 13 August 2019, he made his professional debut for Sochaux in a 2–1 Coupe de la Ligue loss to Paris FC.

International career
Born in France, Ndiaye is of Senegalese descent. He was called up to represent the Senegal U23s for a set of 2023 Africa U-23 Cup of Nations qualification matches.

References

External links
 
 Ligue 2 Profile

2001 births
Living people
Sportspeople from Besançon
Senegalese footballers
Senegal youth international footballers
French footballers
French sportspeople of Senegalese descent
Association football midfielders
FC Sochaux-Montbéliard players
Ligue 2 players
Championnat National 3 players
Footballers from Bourgogne-Franche-Comté